"Any Way At All" is a song by American singer-songwriter Donna Summer, recorded as a new track for her 1994 compilation album, Endless Summer: Donna Summer's Greatest Hits. The song written by Summer, her husband Bruce Sudano and Eric Silver, and produced by Michael Omartian. It was released in 1994 as the album's second and final single by Casablanca Records and Mercury Records. The ballad was released in selected countries, with the B-side consisting of a medley of four of her original disco hits from the 1970s: "Dim All the Lights", "Hot Stuff", "Bad Girls", and "Last Dance" 3:43. The cassette single (Casablanca/Mercury 856 803–4) also included "I Feel Love (86th Street Radio Edit)" 4:35, which was not otherwise released in the U.S.

Critical reception
Fell and Rufer from the Gavin Report wrote, "Donna Summer hooks up with producer Michael Omartian to make a new track that just happens to fit comfortably in the context of her greatest hits package, appropriately titled Endless Summer. This one shines as though it already was one of her greatest."

References

1990s ballads
Donna Summer songs
1994 songs
1994 singles
Songs written by Donna Summer
Songs written by Bruce Sudano
Song recordings produced by Michael Omartian
Pop ballads
Contemporary R&B ballads
Soul ballads
Gospel songs
Casablanca Records singles
Mercury Records singles